

Translated books
 First Light 
 Those days 
 East-West Penguin Books India
 The Lovers and the other stories 
 Pratidwandi 
 Murmur in the Woods 
 The Youth 
 Ranu O Bhanu Translated by Sheila Sengupta
 The Lonely Monarch Translated by Swapna Dutta, 
Blood Translated by Debali Mookerjea-Leonard

Awards and honours

Awards
 1972: Ananda Puraskar in general category
 1979: "National poet" honour was given by Akashbani Kolkata
 1983: Bankim Puraskar for the book Sei Somoy
 1984: Sahitya Akademi Award for the book Sei Somoy
 1989: Ananda Puraskar for the book Poorba-Pashchim
 1989: Sahitya Setu puroskar
 1999: Annada-Snowcem puroska for the story Nil Lohiter Golpo
 2003: Annadashankar puroskar
 2004: Saraswati Samman for Prothom Alo
 2011: The Hindu Literary Prize, shortlist, The Fakir
 2012: Sera Bangali Lifetime Achievement Award by Star Ananda

Honors
 2002: Sheriff of Kolkata.
 Honorary D.Litt. from the University of Burdwan

See also
 List of Indian writers

Notes

External links

 
 
 
 Sunil Gangopadhyay at Penguin India
 Sunil Gangopadhyay at the Munzinger-Archiv
 Sunil Gangopadhyay at Poetry International
 Sunil Gangopadhyay at The South Asian Literary Recordings Project, Library of Congress; New Delhi Office, India

Writers from Kolkata
Bengali male poets
1934 births
Indian male novelists
Poets from West Bengal
Indian children's writers
Bengali-language writers
Writers of historical romances
Surendranath College alumni
University of Calcutta alumni
Recipients of the Ananda Purashkar
Recipients of the Sahitya Akademi Award in Bengali
Recipients of the Saraswati Samman Award
Sheriffs of Kolkata
City College, Kolkata alumni
Bengali-language science fiction writers
2012 deaths
People from Faridpur District
20th-century Indian poets
20th-century Indian novelists
International Writing Program alumni
Indian male poets
Novelists from West Bengal
20th-century Indian male writers